Mirin is both a given name and a surname. Notable people with the name include:

Saint Mirin ( 565– 620), Irish monk and missionary
Mirin Dajo, pseudonym of the Dutch performer Arnold Gerrit Henskes (1912–1948)
Nicolas Isimat-Mirin (born 1991), French football player